Kriszta Tunde Incze (born 15 May 1996) is a Romanian freestyle wrestler. She is a three-time medalist at the European Wrestling Championships. In 2019, she represented Romania at the European Games in Minsk, Belarus and won one of the bronze medals in the 62 kg event. She also represented Romania at the 2020 Summer Olympics in Tokyo, Japan.

Career 

She competed in the women's freestyle 63 kg event at the 2015 World Wrestling Championships in Las Vegas, United States. In 2016, she competed at the World Olympic Qualification Tournament held in Istanbul, Turkey hoping to qualify for the 2016 Summer Olympics in Rio de Janeiro, Brazil. A few months later, she won the silver medal in the women's 63 kg event at the 2016 World University Wrestling Championships held in Çorum, Turkey. She lost her bronze medal match in the 60 kg event at the 2017 European Wrestling Championships held in Novi Sad, Serbia. In 2018, she won the bronze medal in the 62 kg event at the European U23 Wrestling Championship held in Istanbul, Turkey.

She won the silver medal in the 65 kg event at the 2019 European Wrestling Championships held in Bucharest, Romania. In the final, she lost against Elis Manolova of Azerbaijan. In 2020, she competed in the women's 62 kg event at the 2020 Individual Wrestling World Cup held in Belgrade, Serbia.

In March 2021, she competed at the European Qualification Tournament in Budapest, Hungary hoping to qualify for the 2020 Summer Olympics in Tokyo, Japan. She did not qualify as she was eliminated in her second match by Elif Jale Yeşilırmak of Turkey. A month later, she won one of the bronze medals in the 65 kg event at the 2021 European Wrestling Championships held in Warsaw, Poland. She also failed to qualify for the Olympics at the World Olympic Qualification Tournament held in Sofia, Bulgaria. However, as North Korea withdrew from the 2020 Summer Olympics, Incze received a place to compete in the women's 62 kg event as Rim Jong-sim of North Korea was no longer able to compete.

In August 2021, she competed in the women's 62 kg event at the 2020 Summer Olympics held in Tokyo, Japan. She won her first match against Marianna Sastin of Hungary and she then lost her next match against eventual silver medalist Aisuluu Tynybekova of Kyrgyzstan. In the repechage she was then eliminated by Anastasija Grigorjeva of Latvia. Two months after the Olympics, she competed in the women's 65 kg event at the 2021 World Wrestling Championships held in Oslo, Norway where she was eliminated in her first match by Aina Temirtassova of Kazakhstan.

In 2022, she competed at the Yasar Dogu Tournament held in Istanbul, Turkey. In April 2022, she won the bronze medal in the 65 kg event at the European Wrestling Championships held in Budapest, Hungary. A few months later, she won the bronze medal in her event at the Matteo Pellicone Ranking Series 2022 held in Rome, Italy. She competed in the 65 kg event at the 2022 World Wrestling Championships held in Belgrade, Serbia. She was eliminated in her second match by eventual bronze medalist Koumba Larroque of France.

Achievements

Personal life
She is of Hungarian descent.

References

External links 
 

Living people
1996 births
People from Sfântu Gheorghe
Romanian female sport wrestlers
Wrestlers at the 2019 European Games
European Games bronze medalists for Romania
European Games medalists in wrestling
European Wrestling Championships medalists
Wrestlers at the 2020 Summer Olympics
Romanian sportspeople of Hungarian descent
Olympic wrestlers of Romania
Romanian people of Hungarian descent
21st-century Romanian women